Jules Petiet (5 August 1813 – 29 January 1871) was a French mechanical engineer who worked on the early development of the French railway network.  He was the Chief Engineer of the Chemins de Fer du Nord from 1845, and became a locomotive engineer from 1848. From 1868 until his death, he was head of the prestigious engineering school École Centrale Paris, of which he was also a graduate.

Petiet's name is one of the 72 names inscribed on the Eiffel tower. A street in Paris, rue Petiet (at Épinettes, 17th district) is named in his honour.

Locomotives

Petiet expanded the fleet of Nord locomotives from 187 at his appointment in 1848 to 841 at his death in 1871.

He designed a class of 0-8-0T locomotives known as Fortes Rampes; and built 20 even bigger 0-6-6-0 tank engines. Looking like a pair of 0-6-0s back-to-back, they had a long-rigid chassis. They were not as powerful as anticipated, and Petiet's successor rebuilt them into forty 0-6-0T locomotives.

He introduced the Crampton locomotive to the Nord (and France), and developed an A3A (0-2-6-2-0) Crampton-style tank locomotive. Nicknamed "Camels", eight were built, but they soon were sold to the Nord's Belgian subsidiary Nord-Belge

References 

1813 births
1871 deaths
École Centrale Paris alumni
French engineers
Chemins de Fer du Nord